There have been two battles of Nesbit Moor fought between the Kingdom of Scotland and the Kingdom of England. Their locations lie between Duns and Swinton, in Berwickshire Scotland.

Battle of Nesbit Moor (1355)
Battle of Nesbit Moor (1402)